Alioune Badara Bèye (born 28 September 1945 in Saint-Louis, Senegal) is a Senegalese civil servant, novelist, playwright, poet, and publisher.

In relation to his role as President of L'Association des écrivains du Sénégal (The Senegal Writers' Association), Bèye was the general coordinator of the Festival Mondial des Arts Nègres (Black Arts World Festival) in Dakar on 14 December 12009.

Works
Dialawali, terre de feu ("Dialawali, Land of Fire"), 1980 (theatre)
Le sacre du cedo ("Cedo Coronation") 1982 (theatre)
Maba, laisse le Sine ("Maba, leaves the Sine"), 1987 (theatre)
Nder en flammes ("Nder in Flames"), 1988 (theatre)
Demain, la fin du monde: un avertissement à tous les dictateurs du monde ("Tomorrow, the End of the World: a Warning of all the World's Dictators"), 1993 (theatre)
Les larmes de la patrie ("Tears from Homeland"), 2003 (theatre)
Raki : fille lumière ("Raki: Light Daughter"), 2004 (novel)
Les bourgeons de l'espoir ("Buds of Hope"), 2005 (poetry)
De l'uniforme à la plume ("From Uniform to Pen"), 2008

Bibliography
  Peter France, The new Oxford companion to literature in French, Clarendon Press, 1995, p. 90 
  Babacar Sall, Poésie du Sénégal, Silex/Agence de coopération culturelle et technique, 1988, p. 5

References

External links
 Alioune Badara Bèye sur le site du FESMAN 2009

1945 births
Living people
Senegalese novelists
Senegalese poets
Senegalese dramatists and playwrights